Lake Mary is a rural locality in the Livingstone Shire, Queensland, Australia.

History 
The locality is presumably named after the lake which is in the western part of the locality.

References 

Shire of Livingstone
Localities in Queensland